The Beach 36th Street station (signed as Beach 36th Street–Edgemere station) is a station on the IND Rockaway Line of the New York City Subway. The station is located at the intersection of Beach 36th Street and Rockaway Freeway in Edgemere, Queens. It is served by the A train at all times.

History
This station was originally opened on June 21, 1895, as part of Long Island Rail Road's Far Rockaway Branch and later as a trolley stop of the Ocean Electric Railway, which was designed to accommodate guests of the former Edgemere Hotel. It was relocated 600 feet east of its former location in August 1940 and reopened on April 10, 1942. This station along with all others on the Far Rockaway Branch west of Far Rockaway closed on October 3, 1955, after a fire destroyed the Jamaica Bay trestle that linked the branch with the main line. New York City Transit brought the line from the LIRR and converted all stations, including this one, for the subway. The new stations opened on June 28, 1956.

Station layout

This elevated station has two tracks and two side platforms. Both platforms have beige windscreens and canopies with green support columns in the center and full height metallic fences at both ends.

Exits
The station's only entrance/exit is an elevated brick station house beneath the tracks. It has a turnstile bank, station agent booth, waiting area that allows a free transfer between directions, two staircases to each platform at the center, and two staircases to either side of Rockaway Freeway between Beach 35th and Beach 36th Streets. The two southern street stairs are connected to the station house with a large canopied overpass.

References

External links 

 
 Station Reporter — A Rockaway
 The Subway Nut — Beach 36th Street – Edgemere Pictures 
 Beach 36th Street entrance from Google Maps Street View
Platforms from Google Maps Street View

IND Rockaway Line stations
Rockaway, Queens
New York City Subway stations in Queens, New York
Railway stations in the United States opened in 1956
1956 establishments in New York City
Railway stations in the United States opened in 1895
1895 establishments in New York City